This is a list of player transfers involving Aviva Premiership teams leading up to and including the 2015–16 season.   The list is of deals that are confirmed and are either from or to a rugby union team in the Premier League during the 2014–15 season or 2015–16 season. It is not unknown for confirmed deals to be cancelled at a later date.

Bath

Players In
 Nikola Matawalu from  Glasgow Warriors
 Rhys Priestland from  Scarlets
 Tom Dunn promoted from Academy
 Charlie Ewels promoted from Academy
 Tom Homer from  London Irish
 Jonathan Evans from  Newport Gwent Dragons
 Jeff Williams from  England Sevens
 David Denton from  Edinburgh Rugby

Players Out
 Paul James to  Ospreys
 Gavin Henson to  Bristol Rugby
 Olly Woodburn to  Exeter Chiefs
 Micky Young to  Newcastle Falcons
 Dave Sisi to  London Irish (season-loan)
 Will Skuse to  London Welsh
 Richard Lane to  Jersey
 Peter Stringer to  Sale Sharks
 Carl Fearns to  Lyon
 Ben Williams retired
 Sam Burgess to  South Sydney Rabbitohs

Exeter Chiefs

Players In
 Geoff Parling from  Leicester Tigers
 Olly Woodburn from  Bath Rugby
 Michele Campagnaro from  Benetton Treviso
 Ollie Atkins from  Edinburgh Rugby
 Shaun Malton from  Nottingham
 Will Hooley from  Northampton Saints
 Harry Williams from  Jersey
 Julian Salvi from  Leicester Tigers
 Josh Jones from  St. Helens
 Jonny Hill from  Gloucester Rugby
 James Short from  London Irish

Players Out
 Tom James to  Cardiff Blues
 Greg Bateman to  Leicester Tigers
 Dean Mumm to  NSW Waratahs
 Kieran Davies to  Nottingham
 Fetu'u Vainikolo to  Oyonnax
 Joel Conlon to  Saracens
 Ceri Sweeney to  Pontypridd RFC
 James Scaysbrook retired
 Will Carrick-Smith to  London Scottish

Gloucester

Players In
 Tom Marshall from  Chiefs
 Henry Purdy promoted from Academy
 Jeremy Thrush from  Hurricanes
 Bill Meakes promoted from Academy
 Paul Doran-Jones from  Harlequins
 Paddy McAllister from  Aurillac
 Nicky Thomas from  Ospreys
 Willi Heinz from  Crusaders
 Tom Lindsay from  Wasps
 Tom Hicks promoted from Academy
 Mat Protheroe from  Hartpury RFC
 Callum Braley promoted from Academy
 Steph Reynolds promoted from Academy
 Joe Latta from  Highlanders

Players Out
 Dan Robson to  Wasps
 Aled Thomas to  Scarlets
 Aleki Lutui to  Ampthill
 Tom Palmer to  Benetton Treviso
 Rory Bartle to  London Scottish
 Jonny Hill to  Exeter Chiefs
 Shaun Knight to  Newport Gwent Dragons
 Shane Monahan to  Munster
 Sila Puafisi to  Glasgow Warriors

Harlequins

Players In
 James Horwill from  Queensland Reds
 Matt Shields from  Darlington Mowden Park
 Adam Jones from  Cardiff Blues
 Tim Visser from  Edinburgh Rugby
 Owen Evans from  Newport Gwent Dragons
 Tim Swiel from  Sharks
 Winston Stanley from  Highlanders
 Jamie Roberts from  Racing 92
 Mat Luamanu from  Benetton Treviso
 Harry Sloan promoted from Academy

Players Out
 Paul Doran-Jones to  Gloucester Rugby
 Joe Trayfoot to  London Irish
 George Robson to  Oyonnax
 Ugo Monye retired
 Asaeli Tikoirotuma to  London Irish
 Darryl Marfo to  London Welsh
 Tom Williams retired
 Tom Casson to  Yorkshire Carnegie
 Jordan Burns to  Bedford Blues
 Jordan Turner-Hall retired

Leicester Tigers

Players In
 Opeti Fonua from  London Welsh
 Mike Williams from  Worcester Warriors
 Brendon O'Connor from  Blues
 Peter Betham from  NSW Waratahs
 Michael Fitzgerald from  Chiefs
 Lachlan McCaffrey from  London Welsh
 Jono Kitto from  Chiefs
 Greg Bateman from  Exeter Chiefs
 Dominic Barrow from  Newcastle Falcons
 George Catchpole promoted from Academy
 Aniseko Sio promoted from Academy
 Telusa Veainu from  Melbourne Rebels
 Jean de Villiers from  Stormers
 Matías Agüero from  Zebre

Players Out
 Jamie Gibson to  Northampton Saints
 Geoff Parling to  Exeter Chiefs
 Neil Briggs to  Sale Sharks
 Pablo Matera to  Pampas XV
 Louis Deacon retired
 Blaine Scully to  Cardiff Blues
 Tom Price to  Scarlets
 Brad Thorn retired
 Javiah Pohe to  US Carcassonne
 Scott Hamilton to  Coventry RFC
 Robert Barbieri to  Benetton Treviso
 Greg Peterson to  Glasgow Warriors
 Julian Salvi to  Exeter Chiefs
 Tom Bristow to  Wasps
 Jack Whetton to  USO Nevers
 David Mele to  Toulouse
 Rhys Williams to  Moseley
 Anthony Allen retired
 Terrence Hepetema to  Bay of Plenty

London Irish

Players In
 Ben Franks from  Hurricanes
 Sean Maitland from  Glasgow Warriors
 Brendan McKibbin from  New South Wales Waratahs
 Joe Trayfoot from  Harlequins
 Dominic Waldouck from  Northampton Saints
 Dave Sisi from  Bath Rugby (season-loan)
 Matt Symons from  Chiefs
 Tom Cruse from  Rotherham Titans
 Eoin Sheriff from  Saracens
 Asaeli Tikoirotuma from  Harlequins
 Gerard Ellis promoted from Academy
 Richard Palframan promoted from Academy
 Tom Fowlie promoted from Academy
 Tom Smallbone promoted from Academy
 Rob McCusker from  Scarlets
 Ciaran Hearn from  The Rock
 Will Lloyd from  Auckland

Players Out
 Tomás O'Leary to  Munster
 Tom Homer to  Bath Rugby
 Kieran Low to  Glasgow Warriors
 Eamonn Sheridan to  Oyonnax
 Sean Cox retired
 Myles Dorrian to  Bedford Blues
 Guy Armitage to  London Welsh
 Harry Allen to  London Welsh
 Daniel Leo to  London Welsh
 Jamie Hagan to  Melbourne Rebels
 James Short to  Exeter Chiefs
 Michael Mayhew to  Waikato
 Matt Parr released

Newcastle Falcons

Players In
 Chris Harris promoted from Academy
 Micky Young from  Bath Rugby
 Mike Delany from  Clermont Auvergne
 Marcus Watson from  England Sevens
 Sonatane Takulua from  Northland
 Simon Hammersley  promoted from Academy
 Ben Harris from  Yorkshire Carnegie
 Taione Vea from  London Welsh
 Jon Welsh from  Glasgow Warriors
 Nili Latu from  NEC Green Rockets
 Giovanbattista Venditti from  Zebre
 Paddy Ryan from  Libournes
 Mouritz Botha from  Sharks
 Sean Robinson promoted from Academy
 Todd Clever from  Old Mission Beach Athletic Club
 Belisario Agulla from  Agen

Players Out
 Kieran Brookes to  Northampton Saints
 Mike Blair to  Glasgow Warriors
 Andy Saull to  Yorkshire Carnegie
 Ben Morris to  Nottingham
 Phil Godman retired
 Chris York to  Ealing Trailfinders
 Danny Barnes to  Ealing Trailfinders
 Dominic Barrow to  Leicester Tigers
 Andy Davies to  Rotherham Titans
 Mark Irving to  Viadana
 Rory Clegg to  Glasgow Warriors
 Lee Smith to  Wakefield Trinity Wildcats
 Oliver Tomaszczyk to  Ospreys
 Uili Kolo'ofai to  Jersey
 Noah Cato released
 Jamie Helleur released
 Warren Fury released
 Sean Brown released
 James Christie released

Northampton Saints

Players In
 JJ Hanrahan from  Munster
 Kieran Brookes from  Newcastle Falcons
 Jamie Gibson from  Leicester Tigers
 Michael Paterson from  Sale Sharks
 Tom Kessell from  Cornish Pirates
 Pat Howard from  Stormers
 Paul Hill from  Yorkshire Carnegie
 Sion Bennett from  Scarlets
 Victor Matfield from  Bulls

Players Out
 Salesi Ma'afu to  Toulon
 Samu Manoa to  Toulon
 Phil Dowson to  Worcester Warriors
 Dominic Waldouck to  London Irish
 Will Hooley to  Exeter Chiefs
 Alex Day to  Cornish Pirates
 Joel Hodgson to  Yorkshire Carnegie
 Tom Ryder to  Yorkshire Carnegie
 Cam Dolan to  Cardiff Blues
 Josh Skelcey to  Nottingham
 Tom Mercey released

Sale Sharks

Players In
 Neil Briggs from  Leicester Tigers
 Peter Stringer from  Bath Rugby
 Bryn Evans from  Biarritz Olympique
 James Mitchell promoted from Academy
 George Nott promoted from Academy
 Ciaran Parker promoted from Academy
 Brian Mujati from  Racing 92
 Nev Edwards from  Rosslyn Park

Players Out
 Marc Jones to  Bristol Rugby
 Mark Cueto retired
 Michael Paterson to  Northampton Saints
 Will Cliff to  Bristol Rugby
 Nathan Fowles to  Edinburgh Rugby
 Nathan Hines retired
 Andy Forsyth to  Yorkshire Carnegie
 Alberto De Marchi to  Benetton Treviso
 Luke McLean to  Benetton Treviso
 Darren Fearn to  Darlington Mowden Park

Saracens

Players In
 Samuela Vunisa from  Zebre
 Michael Rhodes from  Stormers
 Maro Itoje promoted from Academy
 Joel Conlon from  Exeter Chiefs
 Dave Porecki from  Manly

Players Out
 Eoin Sheriff to  London Irish
 David Strettle to  Clermont Auvergne
 James Johnston to  Wasps
 Thretton Palamo to  London Welsh (season-loan)
 Nick de Jager to  Blue Bulls
 Ernst Joubert retired

Wasps

Players In
 Jimmy Gopperth from  Leinster
 Dan Robson from  Gloucester Rugby
 Frank Halai from  Blues
 Brendan Macken from  Leinster
 Tom Bristow from  Leicester Tigers
 Jamie Stevenson from  London Scottish
 James Downey from  Glasgow Warriors
 George Smith from  Lyon
 James Johnston from  Saracens
 Alex Rieder from  Rotherham Titans
 Alex Lundberg promoted from Academy
 Tom Howe promoted from Academy
 Charles Piutau from  Blues

Players Out
 Tom Varndell to  Bristol Rugby
 William Helu to  Edinburgh Rugby
 Ed Jackson to  Newport Gwent Dragons
 Charlie Davies to  Newport Gwent Dragons
 Tom Lindsay to  Gloucester Rugby
 Will Taylor to  Scarlets
 Jack Moates to  Jersey
 Oli Evans to  Jersey
 Tom Bliss to  Ealing Trailfinders (season-loan)
 Sam James to  Bedford Blues
 Martyn Thomas to  London Welsh
 Gus Jones to  London Welsh
 Glyn Hughes to  Moseley
 Buster Lawrence to  Moseley
 John Yapp retired
 Chris Bell retired
 Andy Goode retired

Worcester Warriors

Players In
 Andy Short from  Bristol Rugby
 Derrick Appiah from  Mogliano
 Phil Dowson from  Northampton Saints
 Carl Kirwan from  London Welsh
 Tom Heathcote from  Edinburgh Rugby
 Luke Baldwin from  Bristol Rugby
 Sam Lewis from  Ospreys
 Cooper Vuna from  Toshiba Brave Lupus
 Na'ama Leleimalefaga from  Montpellier
 Darren Barry from  Cornish Pirates
 Bryce Heem from  Chiefs
 Mike Daniels promoted from Academy
 Tiff Eden promoted from Academy
 Christian Scotland-Williamson promoted from Academy
 Marco Mama from  Bristol Rugby (season-loan)
 Donncha O'Callaghan from  Munster
 Tevita Cavubati from  Ospreys
 Wynand Olivier from  Montpellier
 Jaba Bregvadze from  RC Kochebi Bolnisi

Players Out
 Andries Pretorius retired
 Mike Williams to  Leicester Tigers
 Alex Gordaș to  CSM București
 Sam Windsor to  Ulster
 Agustin Creevy to  Jaguares
 Jack Cosgrove to  Edinburgh Rugby
 Josh Drauniniu to  London Welsh
 George Porter to  Ealing Trailfinders
 Rob O'Donnell to  Yorkshire Carnegie
 Richard de Carpentier to  England Sevens
 Josh Watkins to  England Sevens
 James Percival to  Grenoble
 Shay Kerry to  Oyonnax
 Ofa Fainga'anuku to  Bayonne
 James Stephenson to  Ealing Trailfinders
 Ignacio Mieres to  US Dax
 Jonathan Thomas retired
 Leonardo Senatore to  Jaguares

See also
List of 2015–16 Pro12 transfers
List of 2015–16 RFU Championship transfers
List of 2015–16 Super Rugby transfers
List of 2015 SuperLiga transfers
List of 2015–16 Top 14 transfers

References

2015-16
2015–16 English Premiership (rugby union)